Qarah Jangal-e Olya (also Romanized as Qarah Jangal-e ‘Olyā; also known as Qarah Jangal-e Bālā) is a village in Badranlu Rural District, in the Central District of Bojnord County, North Khorasan Province, Iran. With knowledge of the 2006 census, its population was 248, in 51 families.

References 

Populated places in Bojnord County